Shaikh Hasan Jalayir (died October 9, 1374) was briefly Jalayirid ruler for one day. He was the eldest son of Shaikh Uways Jalayir. After his father died, Hasan succeeded him, but was immediately executed by his amirs, who then put his brother Husain on the throne.

His father-in-law Qadi Shaykh Ali, leading ulama of Tabriz, protested this and was exiled to Damascus.

References

Peter Jackson (1986). The Cambridge History of Iran, Volume Six: The Timurid and Safavid Periods. 
Edward G. Browne (1926). A Literary History of Persia: The Tartar Dominion. 

1374 deaths
Jalayirids
Year of birth unknown